The American Federation of Musicians of the United States and Canada (AFM/AFofM) is a 501(c)(5) labor union representing professional instrumental musicians in the United States and Canada. The AFM, which has its headquarters in New York City, is led by president Raymond M. Hair Jr. Founded in Cincinnati in 1896 as the successor to the National League of Musicians, the AFM is the largest organization in the world to represent professional musicians. It negotiates fair agreements, protects ownership of recorded music, secures benefits such as healthcare and pension, and lobbies legislators. In the U.S., it is known as the American Federation of Musicians (AFM), and in Canada, it is known as the Canadian Federation of Musicians/Fédération Canadienne des Musiciens (CFM/FCM). The AFM is affiliated with AFL–CIO, the largest federation of unions in the United States and the Canadian Labour Congress, the federation of unions in Canada.

Among the best known AFM actions was the 1942–44 musicians' strike, orchestrated to pressure record companies to agree to a better arrangement for paying royalties.

History 
The roots of the musicians’ collective action began with the New York City-based Musical Mutual Protective Union, which took the first steps toward creating uniform scales for different types of musical employment in 1878. By March 1886, delegates from 15 different protective unions across the U.S. came together to form the National League of Musicians to discuss and rectify common issues, such as competition from traveling musicians.

The American Federation of Labor recognized the American Federation of Musicians (AFM) in 1896. A group of delegates had broken away from the National League of Musicians in order to form a more egalitarian organization, inclusive to all musicians. Seeking to give meaning to the phrase "In unity there is strength," the first standing resolution of the AFM was: "That any musician who receives pay for his musical services, shall be considered a professional musician." The first convention, upon which the American Federation of Musicians was founded, was held October 1896 at the Hotel English in Indianapolis, Indiana. The group had 3,000 members and Owen Miller became the first AFM president. In 1896, Miller said: "The only object of AFM is to bring order out of chaos and to harmonize and bring together all the professional musicians of the country into one progressive body." 

At the same time, the trade-union movement was taking hold throughout North America. Unions representing all types of laborers were forming to exercise collective strength to raise wages, improve working conditions and secure greater dignity and respect for working people. In 1887, the AFL and the Knights of Labor first invited the National League of Musicians to affiliate with the trade-union movement, but the offers produced deep divisions within the National League of Musicians. Some members objected to musicians being called laborers, insisting instead that they were "artists and professionals." As the American music scene prospered and more symphony orchestras were founded, the need for a national organization for musicians increased.

In 1897, the union became international when the Montreal Musicians Protective Union and Toronto Orchestral Association joined.

By 1900, the union changed its name to the American Federation of Musicians of the United States and Canada and was actively organizing on both sides of the border.

A 1903 resolution was passed prohibiting foreign bands taking work from domestic bands. It was followed by a 1905 letter from the AFM petitioning president Theodore Roosevelt to protect American musicians by limiting the importation of musicians from outside Canada and the U.S.

By 1905, an official position on the International Executive Board was created to provide Canadian representation at the federation level. Early accomplishments of the union included setting the first scales for orchestras traveling with comic operas, musical comedies and grand opera. Among the pressing issues was competition from both foreign musicians and off-duty military musicians.

In its first 10 years, the AFM had organized 424 locals and 45,000 musicians in the U.S. and Canada. Virtually all instrumental musicians in the U.S. were union members. In 1906, the 10-year-old organization made a donation of $1,000 to earthquake victims in San Francisco.

A 1908 appropriations bill banned armed-services musicians (exempting Marines) from competing with civilians. In 1916, Congress passed a law prohibiting all armed-services members from competing with civilians.

During the World War I era, general unemployment affected musicians. Silent films displaced some forms of traditional entertainment, and with a declining economy and other factors, many musicians were laid off.

Technology and legislation 

In 1918, two important legislative measures, Prohibition and a 20% cabaret tax to support the war effort, negatively impacted many musicians. Prohibition ended after 13 years, but the cabaret tax took its toll on the music industry for many years to come.

The Copyright Act of 1909 created the first compulsory mechanical license stipulating royalty payments be paid by the user of a composer’s work, but the law excluded musicians.

In the 1920s, new technologies challenged live music for the first time. The advent of recording and radio forever changed the landscape of musician employment. At AFM conventions, the union decried the use of canned music and forbid orchestra leaders from advertising their orchestras free of charge on radio. By the end of the 1920s, many factors had reduced the number of recording companies. As the nation recovered from World War I, technology advanced and there was diversity in recording and producing music. In 1927, the first "talkie" motion picture was released and within two years, 20,000 musicians lost their jobs performing in theater pits for silent films. Minimum wage scales were created for vitaphone, movietone and phonograph recording work. In 1938, film companies signed their first contract with AFM at a time when musicians were losing income as phonograph records replaced radio orchestras and jukeboxes competed with live music in nightclubs.

The AFM founded the Music Defense League in 1930 to gain public support against canned music in movie theaters.

The AFM set higher scales for the recording work than for live work, negotiating the first industry-wide agreements in the labor movement. While musicians flocked to Los Angeles hoping for high-paying recording work, fewer than 200 new jobs were created by the technology.

To help musicians find fair pay and union jobs, the AFM created a booking-agent licensing policy in 1936, and in 1938, developed a similar program for licensing record companies.

While national scales were set for live musicians working on fledgling radio networks, some stations had already begun using recordings. The 1937 AFM convention mandated Weber to fight against the use of recorded music on radio. He called a meeting with representatives of radio, transcription and record companies, threatening to halt all recording work nationwide. After 14 weeks, the stations agreed to spend an additional $2 million to employ staff musicians, but the Department of Justice later ruled the agreement illegal.

Petrillo strikes 
Labor leader James Petrillo took command of the AFM in 1940. He took a stronger stance, challenging technological unemployment. Among the most significant AFM actions was the 1942–44 musicians' strike (sometimes called the "Petrillo ban"), orchestrated to pressure record companies to agree to a royalty system more beneficial to the musicians. The strike forced the recording industry to establish a royalty on recording sales to employ musicians at live performances. This resulted in the Music Performance Trust Fund (MPTF), which was established in 1948 and continues to sponsor free live performances throughout the U.S. and Canada. When the MPTF began disbursals, it became the largest single employer of live musicians in the world.

Petrillo organized a second recording ban from January 1 to December 14, 1948 in response to the Taft–Hartley Act.

In the 1950s, the MPTF was reapportioned to form the AFM Pension Fund and the Sound Recording Special Payment Fund.

Numerous labor actions in the following decades improved industry standards and working conditions for musicians. New agreements covered TV programs, cable TV, independent films and video games. Pension funds were established and musicians also secured groundbreaking contracts providing royalties for digital transmissions and from recordings of live performances.

AFM leadership challenged 

Petrillo’s tactics were not universally accepted. While his 1955 negotiations had led to increased payments into the funds, the lack of a scale increase angered some full-time recording musicians.

Musicians were promised a voice at the next round of meetings in 1958, but talks broke down and a strike was called. When calls for Petrillo to reopen negotiations were rejected, a group of disgruntled Los Angeles musicians formed a dual union, the Musicians Guild of America.

In 1946, Congress passed an act known as "the anti-Petrillo Act" that made it a criminal offense for a union to use coercion to win observance of its rules by radio stations. Collective bargaining with broadcasters over hiring standby musicians and paying for rebroadcasts of live performances became illegal. As a result, live broadcasts on radio were almost completely eliminated.

When Petrillo retired, Herman D. Kenin took over as AFM president. In 1958 and 1959, rank-and-file committees of recording musicians sat at the table while Kenin negotiated favorable agreements with the recording, television and jingle industries. The Musicians Guild of America was defeated in a 1960 representation election and the AFM regained bargaining rights for motion-picture studios.

Political lobbying 

During the 1960s, the AFM organized its political lobbying efforts, creating the TEMPO political action committee. Among the pressing issues of the day were government funding for music programs and repeal of the 20% cabaret tax.

Amid the beginning of the British Invasion in 1964, Kenin lobbied directly to the U.S. Secretary of Labor, W. Willard Wirtz, to place an embargo on rock and roll musicians coming to the U.S. from the U.K. Kenin worried about British musicians taking away jobs from Americans, contending that there was little difference between their music, making it unnecessary for the Beatles and other acts to perform. When Kenin's desire to ban the Beatles was widely reported, Beatles fans from across the U.S. sent letters to the AFM condemning the organization.

The AFM also sought to lend its voice to national labor issues such as the fight against right-to-work laws. In 1951, lobbying efforts against the cabaret tax paid off when nonprofit organizations, including symphony orchestras, were exempted. In 1957, Congress reduced the tax to 10%, resulting in a $9 million rise in nightclub bookings by 1960. In 1966, the tax was finally repealed.

Federal funding 

In 1955 the AFM formally asked Congress to subsidize the arts industry. The federation cited its concern for preserving America’s cultural heritage and protecting the country’s less commercially viable styles: jazz, folk and symphonic music.

The effort paid off in 1965 when President Johnson signed 20 U.S.C. 951, creating the National Endowment for the Arts (NEA). At the 1966 AFM convention, the initial $2 million in NEA appropriation was announced. Much of the subsequent growth in professional symphony orchestras in the U.S. was a direct result of the NEA. AFM president Ray Hair said: "Government arts funding is critical to the ongoing financial and artistic well-being of American professional musicians. ... For nearly 50 years NEA funding has enriched our communities, supported our jobs, and helped achieve cultural balance within virtually every congressional district."

The Parliament of Canada used the death duties of two Canadian millionaire estates to establish the Canada Council for the Arts in 1957. According to an International Musician article the council was responsible for "creating an aura of musical achievement such as the country has never witnessed." In 2014 and 2015, the council allocated $155.1 million to the arts in Canada.

By 1960, tape recorders were making sound and video recordings easier and cheaper on a global scale. In 1961, the AFM participated in the Rome Convention to develop an international treaty extending copyright protection. However, because of pressure from American broadcasters, the federal government declined to sign the treaty. To date, only the U.S., China and North Korea have not signed the treaty. Therefore, American musicians and record companies receive no performance royalties from terrestrial AM/FM radio.

Through much of the early history of the AFM, union locals were segregated for black and white musicians. Black and white locals eventually began to merge, starting with Los Angeles in 1953, and by 1974 all locals were integrated.

21st century
At the AFM convention in Las Vegas on June 23, 2010, the AFM elected Ray Hair for a three-year term as president. Hair was reelected for an additional three years in July 2013, in June 2016 and again in June 2019.

The AFM is active in trying to prevent plagiarism and illegal downloading. The sheer volume of recording-industry output contributes to the possibility that songs might overlap in sound, melody or other details of composition.

In 2019, the AFM had a membership of 73,071.

Local 767 

In 1920, the AFM opened local 767 in Los Angeles along Central Avenue. It was a rehearsal and meeting space for black musicians who were denied access to white Hollywood jazz clubs. Acclaimed jazz musicians such as Duke Ellington and Horace Tapscott rehearsed at and frequented the space. Local 767 also existed as a cultural and community center for blacks in the surrounding neighborhoods, hosting cookouts, parades and various events for the community. Younger musicians received hands-on guidance and were given opportunities to enter into the local jazz scene.

Locations 
The American Federation of Musicians, headquartered in New York City, has federation offices in Los Angeles, Toronto and Washington, D.C., and oversees hundreds of contributing member locals across the United States and Canada.

Composition

According to the AFM's records since 2006, when membership classification was first reported, about 81% of the union's membership are "regular" members who are eligible to vote for the union. In addition to the other voting eligible "life" and "youth" classifications, the "inactive life" members have the rights of active union members except that "they shall not be allowed to vote or hold office" according to the bylaws in exchange for the rate less than "life" members. As of 2019, this accounted for 60,345 "regular members" (83% of total), 11,297 "life" members (15%), 549 "inactive life" members (1%) and 880 "youth" members (1%).

Leadership
In 2019, the delegates to the 101st AFM convention in Las Vegas reelected Ray Hair, who was first elected in 2010, as president.

Presidents
 1896–1900 Owen Miller
 1900–1914 Joseph N. Weber
 1914–1915 Frank Carothers
 1915–1940 Joseph N. Weber
 1940–1958 James C. Petrillo
 1958–1970 Herman D. Kenin
 1970–1978 Hal Davis
 1978–1987 Victor Fuentealba
 1987–1991 J.Martin Emerson
 1991–1995 Mark Massagli
 1995–2001 Steve Young
 2001–2010 Tom Lee
 2010–present Ray Hair

References

Sources

Further reading
 Robert A. Gorman, "The Recording Musician and Union Power: A Case Study of the American Federation of Musicians", 37 SW L.J. 697 (1984) https://scholar.smu.edu/smulr/vol37/iss4/1
 Michael James Roberts, Tell Tchaikovsky the News: Rock 'n' Roll, the Labor Question, and the Musicians' Union, 1942–1968. Durham, NC: Duke University Press, 2014,  .

External links
 
 Musicians' Association of Seattle Records.  1905–2010. 5.52 cubic feet (7 boxes).
 David Keller manuscript of The Blue Note: Seattle's Black Musician's Union, A Pictorial History.  2000. .21 cubic ft (1 box)
 

 
AFL–CIO
Canadian Labour Congress
Music organizations based in the United States
Trade unions established in 1896